"George" is a song by New Zealand rock band Headless Chickens, released as the lead single from their third studio album, Greedy, in 1994. Charting as a double A-side with the Eskimos in Egypt mix of their 1991 song "Cruise Control", the single reached number one in the band's native New Zealand for four weeks in 1994 and 1995 and received a gold certification from the Recording Industry Association of New Zealand (RIANZ). "George" was nominated for Single of the Year at the 1995 New Zealand Music Awards, losing to Purest Form's "Message to My Girl". In 1997, the song was released in Australia, where it peaked at number 67 on the ARIA Singles Chart.

Music video
The music video for "George" was directed by Stephen McGlashan and Marcus Ringrose. It features the band performing the song in black-and-white while various coloured, ominous clips are show, including one of a tattooed man crawling across concrete. NZ On Screen called the video "strong", noting how the tone matches the song's "menacing" lyrics. The song's video, along with the clip for the Eskimos in Egypt mix of "Cruise Control", was nominated for Best Video at 1995 New Zealand Music Awards but lost to the video for Supergroove's "Can't Get Enough".

Track listing
CD and cassette single
 "George"
 "Cruise Control" (Eskimos in Egypt mix)
 "Bestiary"
 "Milton Babbit's Rarotongan Holiday"

Credits and personnel
Credits are taken from the CD single and the Greedy liner notes.

Studios
 Recorded in September 1994 at York St. Studios (Parnell, Auckland, New Zealand)
 Mastered at York Street Mastering (Auckland, New Zealand)

Headless Chickens
 Headless Chickens – writing, production
 Fiona McDonald – vocals, cover photo
 Chris Matthews – guitars, samples, loops, keyboards
 Grant Fell – bass guitar
 Bevan Sweeney – drums

Other personnel
 Malcolm Welsford – production, engineering
 Nick Treacy – assistant engineering
 Gavin Botica – mastering
 Ward Four – artwork design

Charts

Certifications

References

1994 singles
1994 songs
Black-and-white music videos
Flying Nun Records singles
Headless Chickens songs
Number-one singles in New Zealand